Christian Death is an American rock band formed in Los Angeles County, California, in 1979 by Rozz Williams. With major line-up changes over the years, Christian Death has retained "a relentlessly confrontational stand against organized religion and conventional morality".

Williams was eventually joined by guitarist Rikk Agnew of the band Adolescents, James McGearty on bass guitar and George Belanger on drums. This line-up was responsible for producing the band's best known work, their 1982 debut album Only Theatre of Pain, which was highly influential in the development of the style of music known as deathrock, as well as on the American gothic scene which also produced bands such as Kommunity FK and 45 Grave.

Following the release of Only Theatre of Pain, Christian Death's line-up had fallen apart, and by the time of the band's second album, Catastrophe Ballet (1984), Rozz was joined by Valor Kand of tour mates Pompeii 99 on vocals and guitar. Following the release of the band's third album, Ashes, in 1985, Williams left the band and Kand became frontperson, with no original members of the band remaining. This resulted in a divide in the band's fanbase and controversy that has continued to this day.

History

Formation and Rozz Williams years (1979–1985)
Christian Death was founded by a teenage Rozz Williams in Los Angeles, California in October 1979. Williams grew up in the eastern suburb of Pomona in a Christian family. Williams had originally called his band the Upsetters, which included guitarist Jay (a.k.a. John Albert), bassist James McGearty and drummer George Belanger. The band garnered attention after changing their name to Christian Death and adding former Adolescents guitarist Rikk Agnew. In 1981, they made their first vinyl appearance with the song "Dogs" on the L.A. scene compilation album Hell Comes to Your House.

In 1982, Christian Death signed to Frontier Records, and released their debut album, Only Theatre of Pain that March. Only Theatre of Pain was released in Europe by the French label L'Invitation au Suicide, followed by the record's release in Japan.

Christian Death broke up amid band infighting and drug abuse. Williams assembled a new version of the band in 1983 by merging with another L.A. rock band, Pompeii 99. This lineup included guitarist Valor Kand, vocalist and keyboardist Gitane DeMone, vocalist and bassist Voxx Voltair and drummer David Glass. The new version of the band recorded their next two albums, 1984's Catastrophe Ballet (with bassist Constance Smith) and 1985's Ashes (with bassist Randy Wilde).

Valor Kand era (1985–present)
In mid-1985, Williams left Christian Death, in part due to his increasing interest in experimental music and performance art. Kand took over leadership, serving as lead singer and songwriter. Augmented by bassist Johann Schumann and guitarist and keyboardist Barry Galvin, the band recorded an EP for the Italian label Supporti Fonografici titled The Wind Kissed Pictures, credited to "For Sin And Sacrifice Must We Die A Christian Death". The EP was later reissued in Germany and the U.S., credited to Christian Death.

Their first post-Williams album was 1986's Atrocities, a concept album about the aftereffects of World War II on the European psyche, which was followed by 1987's The Scriptures, recorded by a revamped lineup of Kand, Demone, Glass, guitarist James Beam and bassist Kota. Longtime drummer Glass left the group following the release of The Scriptures and returned to California, where he eventually worked with several Williams side projects.

The band had their biggest successes on the UK Independent Chart with the 1987–89 singles "Sick of Love", "Church of No Return" and "Zero Sex" and the 1988 album Sex and Drugs and Jesus Christ. Following the "Zero Sex" single, Demone opted to leave the band.

Valor recorded the two-part All the Love All the Hate concept album (1989) in collaboration with Nick the Bastard, which spawned the double A-side single "We Fall Like Love"/"I Hate You".

During the late 1980s, while also recording as Shadow Project, Williams resurrected his own version of Christian Death, with his wife Eva O contributing guitar as well as vocals. Billing themselves as the original Christian Death, they were rejoined by first-album guitarist Agnew for a 1989 tour of Canada. The band was signed to Cleopatra Records, and released The Iron Mask album and Skeleton Kiss EP in 1992. Williams' reclamation of the Christian Death name sparked a fierce battle with Kand. However, Kand already had the rights to the name due to Williams' departure from the band and subsequent neglect of the moniker. Williams consequently billed his version of the band as "Christian Death Featuring Rozz Williams". After this, Williams' version released The Path of Sorrows album in 1993 and The Rage of Angels in 1994. A 1993 show featuring Only Theatre of Pain-era members Williams, Agnew and Belanger (along with bassist Casey Chaos) performing live at Los Angeles' Patriot Hall was recorded and later released in 2001 as a DVD by Cleopatra. Williams pursued other projects before committing suicide on April 1, 1998.

Meanwhile, Kand's Christian Death continued performing and recording, issuing the 1990 album Insanus, Ultio, Proditio, Misercordiaque, on which Kand conducted the English Abbey Choir and the Commonwealth Chamber Orchestra. The band added bassist Maitri in 1991. Her first concert with Christian Death took place at the Contemporary Festival, held at the Anfitheatro delle Cascine in Florence, Italy on 12 July 1991. The band released the Sexy Death God album in 1994, the double-live set Amen in 1995, the Nostradamus-themed Prophecies in 1996, and Pornographic Messiah in 1998.

In 2000, Christian Death added drummer Will Sarginson and toured Europe with Britain's Cradle of Filth in support of the Born Again Anti Christian album.

Kand and Maitri also formed another band, black metal/deathrock act Lover of Sin, releasing the album Christian Death Presents Lover of Sin in 2002.

For Christian Death's 2003 tour, they were augmented by Cradle of Filth guitarist Gian Pyres.

Christian Death released American Inquisition in 2007, featuring new drummer Nate Hassan.

In 2014, the band embarked on the 30th Anniversary Catastrophe Ballet tour, beginning in Europe and continuing through the year's end in North, South and Central America.

In January 2015, Christian Death announced the planned release of the PledgeMusic funded album, The Root of All Evilution. The album was digitally released on August 14, 2015, by Knife Fight Media, and on vinyl on October 16, 2015, by Season of Mist. A CD release was announced for December 18, 2015, on The End Records.

The band's next studio album, titled "Evil Becomes Rule", was released in May 2022.

Musical style and content

Christian Death's style is considered gothic rock, deathrock and art punk. According to Steve Huey of AllMusic, Christian Death's music "relied on slow, doomy, effects-laden guitar riffs and ambient horror-soundtrack synths". According to Huey, Christian Death's lyrics involve shock value and are often about topics like "blasphemy, morbidity, drug use, and sexual perversity". Necrophilia also is a topic that has been used in Christian Death's lyrics. Liz Ohanesian of L.A. Weekly wrote that Christian Death experiments "with dirgey guitars, tribal drums and overtly spooky imagery". According to author Liisa Ladouceur, along with "spooky guitars and keyboards", elements of genres such as post-punk and spoken word also have been used in Christian Death's music.

Legacy
Artists that have been inspired by Christian Death include Greg Mackintosh of Paradise Lost and Jonathan Davis of Korn.

Discography

Rozz Williams-led line-ups
 Only Theatre of Pain (1982)
 Catastrophe Ballet (1984)
 Ashes (1985)
 The Iron Mask (1992) (Christian Death Featuring Rozz Williams)
 The Path of Sorrows (1993) (Christian Death Featuring Rozz Williams)
 The Rage of Angels (1994) (Christian Death Featuring Rozz Williams)

Valor Kand-led line-ups
 Atrocities (1986)
 The Scriptures (1987)
 Sex and Drugs and Jesus Christ (1988)
 All the Love All the Hate (Part One: All the Love) (1989)
 All the Love All the Hate (Part Two: All the Hate) (1989)
 Insanus, Ultio, Proditio, Misericordiaque (1990) 
 Sexy Death God (1994)
 Prophecies (1996)
 Pornographic Messiah (1998)
 Born Again Anti Christian (2000)
 American Inquisition (2007)
 The Root of All Evilution (2015)
 Evil Becomes Rule (2022)

References

External links

 Official website

American death rock groups
American gothic rock groups
American musical trios
 
Cleopatra Records artists
Frontier Records artists
Musical groups established in 1979
Musical groups from Los Angeles
Rock music groups from California
ROIR artists
Punk rock groups from California
Season of Mist artists
Candlelight Records artists